Pedro de Munébregan (died 1504) was a Roman Catholic prelate who served as Bishop of Mondoñedo (1498–1504).

Biography
In 1498, Pedro de Munébregan was appointed during the papacy of Pope Alexander VI as Bishop of Mondoñedo.
He served as Bishop of Mondoñedo until his death in 1504.

References 

15th-century Roman Catholic bishops in Castile
16th-century Roman Catholic bishops in Spain
Bishops appointed by Pope Alexander VI
1504 deaths